Prospect research, also known as development research or fundraising research, is a technique through which fundraisers, development teams, and nonprofits gather relevant information about potential donors. Research methods include prospect screening companies, prospect research consultants, and in-house researchers.

Prospect researchers are usually employees of universities, charities or other not for profit organizations. Some are freelancers, or work for private companies. Organizations generally employ prospect researchers to find and qualify potential "major" donors who have the resources to make a large gift to the organization, although the definition of a "large" gift can vary considerably.  A prospect researcher will assess an individual's, company's or charitable trust or foundation's capacity and propensity to donate. Prospect researchers use a variety of resources, including public records, business and financial publications, and Internet databases.

Prospect researchers also focus their search on individuals, companies and foundations on their specific giving interests and philanthropic histories, should they already exist.

Most prospect researchers adhere to a code of ethics to protect both the institutions they represent and the prospects they research.

Prospect researchers conduct research to evaluate a prospect's ability to give, also called capacity (how prospect can financially contribute to your organization), their warmth toward the organization, also called affinity (how close the prospect feels to the organization), and propensity (how likely the individual is to give at all).  Prospect researchers may also analyze data in a donor or constituent database to identify new potential major donors or to predict which groups of constituents are most likely to make major gifts.

Wealth ratings usually refer to a prospect's capacity to donate. One of the most common sources used by prospect researchers for this task are Rich Lists. The Sunday Times Rich List is widely referred to by prospect researchers, but its overall value is disputed. There is a large variety of algorithms that many scholars use to create a wealth score; most would agree in America real estate is the main indicator.

Research is generally conducted via the Internet, but it is also done with the use of subscribed databases like Factiva, LexisNexis and FAME. A researcher may also use government-managed resources such as Companies House, the Charity Commission, or HM Land Registry. Other useful resources include Debrett's and Who's Who, which can provide good general background on any prospect.

Prospect research is an established component of the Prospect Development field pioneered by Bobbie J. Strand, which also encompasses relationship/pipeline management and data analytics for advancement.

References

External links
 APRA (Association for Professional Researchers for Advancement)

Fundraising